This is a list of awards and nominations received by American actor, director and producer Forest Whitaker.

Major associations

Academy Awards
The Academy Awards, popularly known as the Oscars, are awards for artistic and technical merit in the film industry, given annually by the Academy of Motion Picture Arts and Sciences.

British Academy Film Awards 
The British Academy Film Awards (BAFTA Film Awards) are presented in an annual award show hosted by the British Academy of Film and Television Arts to honour the best British and international contributions to film.

Golden Globes Awards 
The Golden Globes Awards are bestowed by the Academy of Television Arts & Sciences (ATAS) in recognition of excellence in American primetime television programming.

Primetime Emmy Awards 
The Primetime Emmy Awards are bestowed by the Academy of Television Arts & Sciences (ATAS) in recognition of excellence in American primetime television programming.

Cannes Film Festival
The Cannes Film Festival, is an annual film festival held in Cannes, France, which previews new films of all genres, including documentaries, from all around the world.

News and Documentary Emmy Awards 
The News & Documentary Emmy Awards are presented by the National Academy of Television Arts & Sciences (NATAS) in recognition of excellence in American national news and documentary programming.

Screen Actors Guild Awards 
The Screen Actors Guild Awards are accolades given by the Screen Actors Guild-American Federation of Television and Radio Artists to recognize outstanding performances in movie and prime time television.

Other awards and nominations

AARP Movies for Grownups Awards
The AARP Movies for Grownups Awards are given annually by the AARP to encourage the film industry to make more movies by and about people over the age of 50.

Audie Awards

BET Awards

Black Reel Awards

British Independent Film Awards
The British Independent Film Awards (BIFA Awards) is an organisation that celebrates, supports and promotes British independent cinema and filmmaking talent in United Kingdom, Australia and New Zealand.

Critics' Choice Movie Awards
The Critics' Choice Movie Awards or Broadcast Film Critics Association Award is an awards show presented annually by the American-Canadian Critics Choice Association (CCA) to honor the finest in cinematic achievement.

Critics' Choice Television Awards

Gotham Awards
The Gotham Awards is an awards show presented annually by the Gotham Film & Media Institute to honor independent films in cinematic achievement.

Guild of Music Supervisors Awards

Independent Spirit Awards
The Independent Spirit Awards are awards dedicated to excellence in the independent film industry, produced by Film Independent, a not-for-profit arts organization that used to produce the LA Film Festival.

NAACP Image Awards
The NAACP Image Awards NAACP Image Awards is an annual awards ceremony presented by the U.S.-based National Association for the Advancement of Colored People to honor outstanding performances in film, television, theatre, music, and literature.

National Board of Review Awards
The NAACP Image Awards NAACP Image Awards is an annual awards ceremony presented by the U.S.-based National Association for the Advancement of Colored People to honor outstanding performances in film, television, theatre, music, and literature.

Satellite Awards
The Satellite Awards are annual awards given by the International Press Academy that are commonly noted in entertainment industry journals and blogs.

Critics awards

References

External links
 

Lists of awards received by American actor
Lists of awards received by film director